Léon Monnier (6 January 1883 in Paris – 26 August 1969 in Morainvilliers) was a French track and field athlete who competed at the 1900 Summer Olympics in Paris, France. Monnier competed in the high jump, finishing seventh of eight with a best jump of 1.60 metres.

References

Sources
 De Wael, Herman. Herman's Full Olympians: "Athletics 1900". Accessed 18 March 2006.

External links
 

Athletes (track and field) at the 1900 Summer Olympics
Olympic athletes of France
French male high jumpers
1883 births
1969 deaths
Olympic male high jumpers
Athletes from Paris